Port of Pevek (port code RU PWE) is a seaport situated on the northern coast of microdistrict Kosa, Pevek, Russia, located in southeastern area of Pevek Strait (Chaun Bay). It is the most northern seaport of Russia.

See also

Transport in Russia

References

External links

Pevek
Transport in Chukotka Autonomous Okrug
Pevek